New Lisbon is the name of several locations, named after the original Lisbon, Portugal:

United States
New Lisbon, Indiana
New Lisbon, Randolph County, Indiana
New Lisbon, New Jersey
New Lisbon, New York
New Lisbon, Ohio, today Lisbon, Ohio
New Lisbon, Wisconsin

Portuguese Empire
New Lisbon, Angola, former name of Huambo, Angola, until 1975
New Lisbon, Brazil, former name of Fortaleza, Brazil, until 1613